Eucithara milia is a small sea snail, a marine gastropod mollusk in the family Mangeliidae.

Description

Distribution
This marine species occurs off China.

References

 Philippi, R. A. "Centuria quarta testaceorum novorum." Zeitschrift für Malakozoologie 8.3 (1851): 39-48.

External links
  Tucker, J.K. 2004 Catalog of recent and fossil turrids (Mollusca: Gastropoda). Zootaxa 682:1-1295.
 G.W. Tryon (1884) Manual of Conchology, structural and systematic, with illustrations of the species, vol. VI; Philadelphia, Academy of Natural Sciences

milia
Gastropods described in 1851